DiPietro is an English surname of Italian origin. Notable people with the surname include:

 Ashley DiPietro (born 1985), American prostitute connected to the Eliot Spitzer prostitution scandal
 Bob DiPietro (born 1927), American baseball player
 David DiPietro (born 1960), American politician
 Joseph A. DiPietro (born 1951), President of the University of Tennessee
 Joe DiPietro (born 1961), American playwright and author
 Luisa DiPietro (born 1954), American academic scientist
 Michael DiPietro (born 1999), Canadian junior ice hockey goaltender
 Paul DiPietro (born 1970),  Canadian-born Swiss professional ice hockey player
 Rebecca DiPietro (born 1979), American model and former professional wrestling personality
 Rick DiPietro (born 1981), American ice hockey goalie
 Rocky Dipietro (born 1956), Canadian Football League player
 Santo DiPietro (1934–2016), American politician

See also

 di Pietro

de:Di Pietro